Rita Louise Tower (born November 21, 1971) is an American former soccer player who played as a forward, making six appearances for the United States women's national team.

Career
Tower played for the Arcadia Tiger Sharks youth team in Phoenix. She also played high school basketball for Arcadia High School. In college, she played for the North Carolina Tar Heels from 1989 to 1990 and 1992 to 1993, winning the NCAA championship in all four seasons. She was included in the ACC's All-Conference and All-Tournament teams in 1993, and was selected in the NCAA All-Tournament team in 1992 and 1993. In total, she scored 33 goals and recorded 32 assists in 81 appearances for the Tar Heels.

Tower made her international debut for the United States on April 10, 1993 in a friendly match against Germany. In total, she made six appearances for the U.S., earning her final cap on April 14, 1994 in a friendly match against Canada. She also participated in the U.S. Olympic Festival in 1989 and 1994.

Tower later coached the Eclipse Soccer Club girls' team.

Personal life
Tower is a native of Phoenix, Arizona. She graduated with a Bachelor's degree from the University of North Carolina at Chapel Hill in 1994.

Career statistics

International

References

1971 births
Living people
Sportspeople from Phoenix, Arizona
Soccer players from Phoenix, Arizona
American women's soccer players
American women's soccer coaches
United States women's international soccer players
Women's association football forwards
North Carolina Tar Heels women's soccer players